The Europe/Africa Zone was one of the three zones of the regional Davis Cup competition in 1998.

In the Europe/Africa Zone there were four different tiers, called groups, in which teams competed against each other to advance to the upper tier. The top two teams in Group III advanced to the Europe/Africa Zone Group II in 1999, whereas the bottom two teams were relegated to the Europe/Africa Zone Group IV in 1999.

Participating nations

Draw
 Venue: Jug Tennis Club, Skopje, Macedonia
 Date: 20–24 May

Group A

Group B

1st to 4th place play-offs

5th to 8th place play-offs

Final standings

  and  promoted to Group II in 1999.
  and  relegated to Group IV in 1999.

Round robin

Group A

Malta vs. Nigeria

San Marino vs. Turkey

Malta vs. Turkey

Nigeria vs. San Marino

Malta vs. San Marino

Nigeria vs. Turkey

Group B

Macedonia vs. Tunisia

Lithuania vs. Moldova

Macedonia vs. Moldova

Lithuania vs. Tunisia

Macedonia vs. Lithuania

Moldova vs. Tunisia

1st to 4th place play-offs

Semifinals

Nigeria vs. Macedonia

Lithuania vs. Turkey

Final

Macedonia vs. Turkey

3rd to 4th play-off

Nigeria vs. Lithuania

5th to 8th place play-offs

5th to 8th play-offs

Tunisia vs. Malta

Moldova vs. San Marino

5th to 6th play-off

Tunisia vs. Moldova

7th to 8th play-off

Malta vs. San Marino

References

External links
Davis Cup official website

Davis Cup Europe/Africa Zone
Europe Africa Zone Group III